The Cayman Islands Department of Commerce & Investment, formerly known as the Cayman Islands Investment Bureau (until 2010), is a government agency that was established to promote investment in the Cayman Islands. The department offers several free services to foreign investors seeking to establish a business in the Cayman Islands. The Investment Bureau also provides assistance to local small businesses, particularly through free workshops and seminars on issues of interest to entrepreneurs.

See also 

 Economy of the Cayman Islands

References

Government of the Cayman Islands
Government agencies of the Cayman Islands